DXIC (711 AM) RMN Iligan is a radio station owned and operated by the Radio Mindanao Network. The station's studio is located at the 4/F, Mejia Bldg., Roxas cor. Aguinaldo St., Iligan, while its transmitter is located at Brgy. Del Carmen, Iligan. DXIC is the pioneer (and only) AM station in Iligan.

References

Radio stations in Iligan
Radio stations established in 1953
News and talk radio stations in the Philippines